Prototype, also known as Prototype X29A, is a 1992 post-apocalyptic science fiction film.

Plot summary
Set in a post-apocalyptic Los Angeles of 2057, Hawkins Coselow, a crippled soldier, along with his ex-lover, Chandra Kerkorian, share vivid psychosexual dreams. Dr. Alexis Zalazny is working on a cybernetic program that will help Coselow walk again. The program sort of works, but everything goes deadly wrong when Coselow becomes a killing machine that can interface with any computer. He ends up killing several people belonging to a resistance movement.

The rebels are led by Omegas, cybernetically altered humans, battled government forces in the crime-ridden streets. In time, the Omegas reprogrammed themselves and carried out their own deadly agenda. In the end, the Omegas were destroyed, except one - implanted in a child, Chandra Kerkorian. Now grown, she is ready to lead the rebellion again.

Cast
 Lane Lenhart as Chandra Kerkorian
 Robert Tossberg as Hawkins Coselow
 Brenda Swanson as Dr. Alexis Zalazny
 Paul Coulj as Dr. Taurence Roberts
 Mitchell Cox as Ariel
 Sebastian Scandiuzzi as Sebastian
 Harold Cannon as Rev. Delaney
 Zack Nesis as Teague
 Woon Young Park as Imperia (as Woon Park)
 Bill Barschdorf as Prototype (as Bill Barshdorf)
 Eric Fedorin as Prototype / Street Fighter
 Marcus Aurelius as Toto Mendez (as Marcus Aurelious)
 Mark Holman as Action
 Max Holman as Jackson
 Raymond Storti as Protector
 Rob Lee as Protector
 Tom Pullano as Bobo
 Kato Kaelin as Regalia
 Hien Nguyen as Thorn
 Natasha Roth as Baby Chandra (as Natasha Mozelle Roth)

External links
 
 Prototype X29A at the Disobiki.
 Prototype X29A at Rotten Tomatoes

1992 films
1992 science fiction films
1990s English-language films
Cyberpunk films
American science fiction action films
Films set in 2057
American post-apocalyptic films
Films set in Los Angeles
Trimark Pictures films
Films directed by Phillip J. Roth
1990s American films